The Shorts was a pop group from the Netherlands consisting of Hans van Vondelen (vocals), Erik de Wildt (keyboard), Hans Stokkermans (bass guitar) and Peter Wezenbeek (drums). The group was formed in 1976, and scored a 1983 international hit with "Comment ça va" produced by Jack Jersey. Last "recorded" appearance is from Sopot Festival 1984.

History
The Shorts were founded under the name De Bliksemafleiders in Leiden in 1977 by producer Danny de Heer. On a talent show he discovered Hans van Vondelen , Erik de Wildt , Peter Wezenbeek , Frank van der Ven and Hans Stokkermans . The then eleven-year-old boys mainly played on a children's show by Eddy de Heer and Danny de Heer. After a few years, the boys made their own single. This single was not a success, but Eddy de Heer wrote the song Comment ça va (in english) as encouragement. After visiting all record companies for a year, record company EMI was willing to release the song (thanks to Ruud Wams of Paloma Music) but in a Dutch version, which was recorded in the Stone sound studio in Roosendaal and written and produced by Jack de Nijs. 

De Bliksemafleiders were now called The Shorts. The Dutch song Comment ça va was initially played mainly on pirate radio, but quickly became a great commercial success. In 1983 it was the best-selling single in the Netherlands. The single was translated into English, Spanish, German and Chinese and released in several countries. In total, more than four million copies were sold. In 1983 The Shorts, Eddy de Heer and Jack de Nijs were awarded the Conamus Export Prize for their international success with Comment ça va.

The following singles from The Shorts could no longer match the success. After several changes in the group, the group split up in 1987.

Discography

The Shorts released two albums and 14 singles.

Albums

Comment ça va

Track list
Comment Ça Va  3:30   
One Pair  3:24   
Een Beetje Vuur  3:41   
Ik Zing  3:55   
Springtime  2:37   
I'm A Musician  4:42   
Je Suis, Tu Es  3:35   
Subway Love  4:15   
I'm Saving  3:25   
Annabelle  3:46   
Goodbye, Don't Cry  4:21

M'n laaste concert
Second album from 1987. 

Track listing
Splash Intro 2:16
Het Monster Van Loch Ness	4:30
Ze Was Zo Mooi	3:18
Vrienden 3:35
Margriet Uit Hazerswoude 3:36
Goodbye Irene 3:47
M'n Laatste Concert 3:26
Annelies 3:52
Maar Toen Kwam Jij	3:37
Verboden Toegang 2:54
In De Twintigste Eeuw 4:15
Door De Bocht 4:09

Singles
CNR
Don't wanna do it (1981)

EMI
Annabelle (1983) 
Comment Ça Va (1983)
Je Suis, Tu Es / Ik Zing (1983)
Que Tal Te Va (Comment Ça VA) (promo) (1984)
Je Hebt Het Maar Geleend (1984)
Tschüss (1984) 
Helemaal Te Gek (1984)

Sky
Ze Was Zo Mooi / She Was So Nice (1985)
Christmas-Eve (1985)
Door De Bocht (1985)
Maar Toen Kwam Jij (1986)
M'n Laatste Concert (1987)

Telstar
Verboden Toegang (1986)

Recent history

Hans van Vondelen owns Fendal Sound Studios. Peter Wezenbeek is an owner of J.P. Audio Visueel BV and Droomtent recording studio. 
Hans Stokkermans is a detective and continues intensively playing as a musician on bass guitar.  Erik de Wildt's owns a drug store.

References

1976 establishments in the Netherlands
Musical groups established in 1976
Dutch pop music groups